Juan Manuel Gutiérrez Freire (born 4 February 2002) is a Uruguayan professional footballer who plays as a forward for Nacional, on loan from Spanish club Almería.

Club career

Danubio
Born in Atlántida, Gutiérrez joined Danubio in 2015, aged 13. On 16 May 2018, he made his first team – and Primera División – debut, coming on as a late substitute for Nicolás Prieto in a 0–2 home loss against Montevideo Wanderers; aged 16 years, three months and 12 days, he became the youngest player to debut for the club in the 21st century.

Gutiérrez scored his first professional goal on 25 August 2019, netting his team's only in a 1–3 defeat at Defensor Sporting. He only scored one further goal for the first team, against Montevideo City Torque, before leaving in September 2020.

Almería
On 13 September 2020, UD Almería reached an agreement in principle with Danubio for the transfer of Gutiérrez. He was announced by his new club two days later, after agreeing to a five-year contract.

Gutiérrez featured almost exclusively for the reserves in Tercera División, and moved back to his home country on 27 August 2021, after agreeing to a two-year loan deal with Nacional.

References

External links

2002 births
Living people
Uruguayan footballers
Uruguayan expatriate footballers
Association football forwards
Uruguayan Primera División players
Danubio F.C. players
Club Nacional de Football players
Tercera División players
UD Almería B players
UD Almería players
Uruguayan expatriate sportspeople in Spain
Expatriate footballers in Spain